Glauco Tomasin (born October 14, 1939) is a retired Italian professional football player and coach.

Career
He played 9 seasons (192 games, 2 goals) in the Serie A for U.C. Sampdoria, A.S. Roma and SPAL 1907.

Tomasin played for Sampdoria from 1958 to 1964, and for SPAL from 1966 to 1969.

References

External links
 Profile at Enciclopedia del Calcio

1939 births
Living people
Sportspeople from Udine
Italian footballers
Serie A players
U.C. Sampdoria players
A.S. Roma players
S.P.A.L. players
Italian football managers
Association football defenders
Footballers from Friuli Venezia Giulia